Eric H. Baker (born May 1973) is an American businessman, the founder and CEO of Viagogo, and co-founder of StubHub.

Early life
Baker was born in May 1973. He was born and grew up in Los Angeles. Baker graduated from Harvard College in 1995, and received an MBA from Stanford Business School in 2001.

Career
Baker worked for McKinsey & Company for two years, and then Bain Capital, a private equity firm in Boston.

Baker co-founded StubHub in 2000, with fellow Stanford classmate Jeff Fluhr, initially as part of a Stanford competition from which they withdrew after being chosen as finalists due to concerns that someone might take their idea. He was its president. StubHub was sold to eBay in 2007 for $310 million.

In 2006, Baker founded Viagogo, and has been its CEO since then. He owns Viagogo through a company called Pugnacious Endeavors, which is based in Delaware.

In May 2018, BBC News reported that the UK Government's digital minister advised that consumers should not use Viagogo, one of the big four secondary ticket sites. Margot James said: “Don’t choose Viagogo - they are the worst”.

In August 2018, the UK's Competition and Markets Authority took Viagogo to the High Court for breaking the law; Baker did not issue any comment or statement. The company reached a resolution with the CMA in November 2018.

In January 2019, the Competition and Markets Authority (CMA) said Eric Baker risked jail over failure to properly protect customers.

References

1973 births
Living people
Businesspeople from Los Angeles
Harvard College alumni
Stanford Graduate School of Business alumni
American chief executives